James M. Lombard (born June 11, 1938) is an English-born American politician in the state of Florida.

Lombard was born in London, England in 1938 and came to Florida in 1976. He received a B.A. from Harvard University in 1961 and did post-graduate work at Boston University.  During his time at Harvard he was a member of the varsity hockey team (1959–60 and 1960-61 seasons). He is a businessman. He served in the Florida House of Representatives from 1984 to 1992 for district 70. He is a member of the Republican Party and is a former Minority Leader of the House.

References

Living people
1938 births
Republican Party members of the Florida House of Representatives
Harvard Crimson men's ice hockey players
Harvard University alumni
Boston University alumni